Cennetin Kapısı is a 1973 Turkish drama film, directed by Fikret Hakan and Halit Refiğ and starring Hakan, Arzu Okay and Sevda Ferdağ.

References

1973 films
Turkish drama films
1973 drama films
Films directed by Halit Refiğ
1970s Turkish-language films